One Way Road may refer to;

"One Way Road", a song by G.E.M. from Heartbeat, 2015
"One Way Road", a song by the John Butler Trio from April Uprising, 2010
"One Way Road", song by Oasis from Who Feels Love?, 2000

See also
 One-way road